Nikolopoulos (Greek: Νικολόπουλος) is a Greek surname, meaning "son of Nikolaos". The female version of the name is Nikolopoulou (Νικολοπούλου). Notable examples include:

Alexandros Nikolopoulos (born 1875), Greek weightlifter
Konstantinos Nikolopoulos (1786-1841), Greek composer, archeologist, and philologist
Stamatios Nikolopoulos, Greek racing cyclist
Christos Nikolopoulos, Greek Motorcyclist

See also 
 Nikolaou
 Nikolaidis

Greek-language surnames
Surnames